Blessed Thomas Holford Catholic College is a secondary school based in Altrincham, Greater Manchester. The school specialises in maths and computing, and is named after Blessed Thomas Holford, a 16th-century priest from Cheshire. The college has a strong Catholic identity, and all pupils are required to wear uniform. The school's principal is Mr J Cornally MBE.

Curriculum
The college puts special emphasis on maths and computing, and follows the Key Stage process. At Key Stage 3 in year 7 & 8, the pupils take the following subjects:
English (3 hours)
Maths (4 hours)
Science (3 hours)
Religious Education (2.5 hours)
Design Technology (3 hours) - Woodwork, food technology, graphic design, art, music, PSHCE
Computer Science (1 hour)
French/Spanish (2 hours)
History (2 hours)
Geography (2 hours)
Physical Education (2 hours)
Drama (1 hour)
For GCSE, the pupils take core subjects including English language, English literature, Science, Mathematics, RE, computer science or BTEC and PE although not to complete as a GCSE. Pupils choose from a variety of additional subjects, including history, geography, art, health and social care, physical education, food technology, business studies, classics, music, Italian, drama, French, German, Japanese, Spanish. BTEC courses for sport are also available. Pupils have to take at least one, but not more than three, of History, Geography, Spanish and French. Out of all the other subjects a maximum of two can be chosen. In 2019, the school was above national average for Section 48 and got outstanding as well in 2012 and 2009 by Ofsted.

Football Academy
The school has a UEFA-standard FieldTurf artificial grass football pitch which was opened in April 2007 by Bobby Charlton. The pitch, which cost £1 million to install, was used by the England national football team for training prior to an away game against Russia at the Luzhniki Stadium in Moscow, as it uses the same surface as the Russian pitch.

References

Secondary schools in Trafford
Catholic secondary schools in the Diocese of Shrewsbury
Altrincham
Voluntary aided schools in England